Ngataiharuru Taepa (born 1976 in Upper Hutt) is a New Zealand artist of Māori (Te Ati Awa, Te Arawa) and Pakeha descent.

Education

Bachelor of Māori Visual Arts, Massey University, 2000
Masters in Māori Visual Arts, Massey University, 2003

Taepa is currently the Kaihautu Toi Māori – Director of Māori Arts at the College of Creative Arts at Massey University.

Career

Taepa is known particularly for his works that use Western art techniques to explore traditional kowhaiwhai (rafter painting) forms. He reproduces the intricate forms of kowhaiwhai using modern materials and manufacturing processes including digital routers, acrylic laminates, stencils on PVC pipes and steel, and digitally carved plywood. The artist has said

Kōwhaiwhai is an expression of the way our ancestors saw the world in their time. Their achievement, using positive and negative spaces, was to have the colours interact simultaneously – as opposed to how most people think now. Now we're taught to see the positive space and not the space around it. It's one of the simple conventions of kōwhaiwhai, but for me it's achieving excellence through simplicity. How do you get to that level? That's what fires me up.

He cites Robert Jahnke, Shane Cotton and Kura Te Waru Rewiri (who all taught him at art school) as significant influences, along with Māori language revivalists including Taiarahia Black, Ian Christensen and Pare Richardson.

Selected exhibitions:

2001 Purangiaho – Seeing Clearly, Auckland Art Gallery 
 2002 Mangopare, Pataka Art + Museum, Porirua 
2005 Manawa Taki – The Pulsing Heart, City Gallery Wellington 
2005 RāHui: Principle of Regulation, Te Manawa, Palmerston North
2007 Telecom Prospect 2007: New Art New Zealand, City Gallery Wellington
2009 Mua Ki Muri, Pataka Art + Museum, Porirua
2009 PLASTIC MĀORI – A Tradition of Innovation, The Dowse Art Museum, Lower Hutt
2010 Double Vision: When Artists Collaborate, Pataka Art + Museum 
2011 Ka kata te po: Hemi Macgregor, Saffronn Te Ratana and Ngataiharuru Taepa, Te Manawa
2013 Ka kata te po shown as part of the 5th Auckland Triennial, Auckland Art Gallery
2015 Te Tini a Pitau: 12 years of kowhaiwhai, Pataka Art + Museum

In 2015 Taepa collaborated with Michel Tuffery on a light display commissioned to mark the opening of Pukeahu National War Memorial Park in Wellington.

In 2000 Taepa was elected onto Te Atinga, the visual arts committee of the Māori arts advocacy organisation Toi Māori Aotearoa.

Taepa's work is held in a number of public collections including the Museum of New Zealand Te Papa Tongarewa, Wellington City Council and the Auckland War Memorial Museum.

Family

Ngataiharuru Taepa's father is artist Wi Taepa and his brother Kereama Taepa is also an artist. Ngataiharuru recalls that when his father began to study art at Whitireia Polytechnic 'I would sit around the kitchen table and listen to people like Manos Nathan, Darcy Nicholas, Robyn Kahukiwa and Ngamoana Raureti. All these people were talking about the issues of the time. ... I have been really fortunate in that way and it's shaped my work and how I work. It inspired me and also gave me a little bit of knowledge, hearing about the struggles they faced as Māori artists, the different issues and how they have dealt with them.'

References

External links
Interview with Taepa about his WWI commemorative work Te Ahi Kaa, Radio New Zealand National, 2015
Review of 2015 exhibition Tipua Eye Contact, 2015
Review of collaborative work Ka kata te po Eye Contact, 2011

Living people
New Zealand artists
New Zealand Māori artists
1976 births
Te Āti Awa people
Te Arawa people
New Zealand Māori academics
Academic staff of the Massey University
Massey University alumni